This list includes all the Portuguese players who played for the Portugal senior national football team who are born outside Portugal. Almost all of this players (94 totally) are born in the former Portuguese colonies, while others (the minority) are naturalized or born abroad.

List by country of birth 
Last update on 10 December 2022

List of players 
The players in bold are currently representing Portugal.

References 

Portugal
 
Association football player non-biographical articles
Portuguese diaspora
Angola–Portugal relations
Mozambique–Portugal relations
Change of nationality in sport